Claudia Bockner (born 15 March 1972) is a German former diver. She competed in the women's 3 metre springboard event at the 1996 Summer Olympics.

References

External links
 

1972 births
Living people
German female divers
Olympic divers of Germany
Divers at the 1996 Summer Olympics
Sportspeople from Gera
20th-century German women